Stephanie Garcia (born May 3, 1988) is an American runner competing primarily in the 3000 metres steeplechase. She represented her country at the 2011 and 2015 World Championships reaching the final on the second occasion.

Competition record

Personal bests
Outdoor
1500 metres – 4:05.39 (Greenville 2015)
One mile – 4:28.84 (Raleigh 2015)
3000 metres – 8:58.09 (Ponce 2014)
5000 metres – 15:16.56 (Stanford 2016)
3000 metres steeplechase – 9:19.48 (Paris 2016)

Indoor
1500 metres – 4:09.97 (New York 2016)
One mile – 4:28.47 (Winston-Salem 2016)
3000 metres – 8:53.20 (Glasgow 2016)

References

External links
 
 USATF profile for Stephanie Garcia

1988 births
Living people
American female middle-distance runners
American female steeplechase runners
World Athletics Championships athletes for the United States
Sportspeople from Austin, Texas
Virginia Cavaliers women's track and field athletes
Virginia Cavaliers women's cross country runners